Rev’n is an American vehicle-oriented digital broadcast television network owned by Get After It Media and launched on November 3, 2014.

History
As early as October 2012, Luken Communications, LLC was planning a car focused channel then called My Car TV. The concept was later retooled and renamed prior to launch, with the network focusing on all automotive vehicles, including cars, trucks, boats, motorcycles and more.

Programs
A partial list includes:

 Amazing World of Automobiles
 Best of the World of Collector Cars
 Bidding Wars
 Classic Cars
 Curator's Vault (E/I)
 Dream Car Garage
 Dream Ridez
 Formula Drift
 FreeRide
 Hidden Heroes
 Inside Drag Racing
 Lokar Car Show
 Mother's Car Show
 Motorhead Garage
 Motorz TV
 My Classic Car
 Off Road Action
 On the Water
 Operation Repo
 Performance TV
 Pleasure Boater
 Reality Rides (E/I)
 Rev'n News
 Road Classics
 Sam's Garage starring Sam Mahdavi
 Sport Compact TV
 Stacey David's GearZ
 Steel Dreams
 Superlift's Off-Road Adventures
 Tech Garage
 The Exciting World of Speed and Beauty
 Trippin' on Two Wheels
 Truck U
 Two Guys Garage
 USAR Racing
 Valvoline Racing Radio on Rev'n
 V8TV
 World of Trucks

Unusually for a specialty network, both of Rev'n's federally mandated educational and informational programs are more or less exclusive to the channel, and with both carrying an automotive theme, Rev'n does not need to break from its format to air them. Each show airs multiple episodes during the week to fill the three-hour minimum requirements.

Affiliates

In addition to terrestrial affiliates, Rev'n is also available through a free Internet stream on the station's Web site, as well as through subscriptions to the Klowd TV, NKTelco, and FilmOn streaming services.

Former affiliates

References

External links
 
 Luken Communications website

Television channels and stations established in 2014